Dorypetalum is a genus of millipedes in the family Dorypetalidae. The seven species of Dorypetalum are found throughout the Balkan peninsula, the Carpathian mountains and Asia Minor.

Species 
There are currently seven described species in the genus:

 Dorypetalum bosniense 
 Dorypetalum bosporanum 
 Dorypetalum bulgaricum 
 Dorypetalum degenerans 
 Dorypetalum helenae 
 Dorypetalum marmaratum 
 Dorypetalum trispiculigerum

References 

Callipodida
Millipede genera